Menzelinsk (Minzälä) is a town and the administrative center of Menzelinsky District in the Republic of Tatarstan, Russia, located on the Menzelya River near its confluence with the Kama,  from the republic's capital of Kazan. Population:    15,800 (1973).

History
It was founded in 1584–1586 and was granted town status in 1781, when it was a part of Ufa Governorate. Menzelinsk Fair was a notable event in the 19th century and in the beginning of the 20th century. The town served as the administrative center of a kanton in 1920–1930 and as the district administrative center since then.

Administrative and municipal status
Within the framework of administrative divisions, Menzelinsk serves as the administrative center of Menzelinsky District, to which it is directly subordinated. As a municipal division, the town of Menzelinsk is incorporated within Menzelinsky Municipal District as Menzelinsk Urban Settlement.

Economy
As of 1997, industrial enterprises in the town included a bakery, a distillery, and a construction materials factory.

There is an airport in the town. The nearest railway station is Krugloye Pole on the Agryz–Akbash line,  to the northeast.

Demographics

As of 1989, Russians accounted for 49.3% of the town's population, while Tatars comprised 46.8% and Mari—1.6%.

References

Notes

Sources

Cities and towns in Tatarstan
Menzelinsky Uyezd
Populated places established in the 1580s